Eastcott is a hamlet  north-east of Bude in Cornwall, England.

References

Hamlets in Cornwall
Morwenstow